The Lambda 8300 was a Sinclair ZX81 clone from Lambda Electronics Limited of Hong Kong. It had a modified ROM (including extra semigraphic characters) and extra hardware, making it not fully compatible.  Total compatibility could be achieved by installing a ZX81 ROM.  

It came with 2K RAM (expandable to 16K or 32K), three octave single voice sound (generated by a C4005 ULA I/O chip) and an Atari joystick port. Specifically, it used a NEC D780C-1 (Z80A clone) microprocessor at 3.25 MHz.

The character set was slightly altered from the ZX81, replacing some symbols with game graphics (see below). BASIC tokens have alternate codings, preventing 100% compatibility with the ZX81. Command input is done key by key (not by keyword entry like on the ZX81).

The computer was somewhat successful in Northern Europe (mostly in Denmark and Norway) and China, and today enthusiasts still develop new hardware.

The Lambda 8300 can be emulated on modern systems using, for example, the EightyOne Sinclair Emulator or MAME.

Models

The machine was licensed to several diferent companies, with many rebranded models available in diferent markets. Unisonic distributed it as the Futura 8300 in the US. In France it was available as the DEF 3000.

Known model designations:
Lambda 8300 (Hong Kong, United Kingdom, Sweden, Norway, Denmark)
Your Computer PC 8300 (China, United States)
DEF 3000 (France)
Basic 2000 (Norway, Sweden, Finland)
Marathon 32K (Norway, Denmark)
Tonel PC (Italy, Germany)
Unisonic Futura 8300 (the United States of America)
PC-81 Personal Computer (China)
CAC-3 (China)
Polybrain P118 (New Zealand)

Creon Electronics Power 3000 (Hong Kong, Germany, Denmark, Canada)
NF300 jiaoXueDianNao (China)
Basic 2000

Basic 3000
PC 2000

Character set 
BASIC tokens also have alternate codings.

References

External links
 Old-computers.com
 Sinclairzxworld.com

Z80-based home computers
Sinclair ZX81 clones